The Military Band Service of the Ministry of Emergency Situations of Russia is a special military department that is the official military band service for the Ministry of Emergency Situations of Russia, being a branch of the Military Band Service of the Armed Forces of Russia.

In total, the band service includes 31 military bands. As of 1 February 2019, the EMERCOM Band Service consists of the following: 12 bands of rescue military units; 19 bands of FPS EMERCOM establishments. These include bands of directorates in Arkhangelsk and St. Petersburg.

History
The band service was established in accordance with a ministerial decree on 1 January 1995. On the directive of the EMERCOM of Russia on 1 April 2016, the band service and the Exemplary Band were included in the staff of the academy of the Russian State Fire Service. In 2017, by the decree of President Vladimir Putin, Colonel Vladislav Rybenko of the band service was awarded the honorary title of Honored Artist of the Russian Federation.

EMERCOM Band
Also known as the EMERCOM Band, the Exemplary Band of the Russian Emergencies Ministry was created on 12 May 1995. At the time of its founding, it was originally named the Exemplary Band of the Ministry of Civil Defense, Emergencies and Elimination of Consequences of Natural Disasters. In 2010, it was given its current name. The band actively performs in important venues of the capital, including the Great Hall of the Moscow Conservatory and the Grand Kremlin Palace. The musicians participate in Russian and international festivals of military bands. The EMERCOM Band consists of 97 musicians, whose repertoire consists of Western European and Russian music. The band director is Lieutenant Colonel of the Internal Service Anton Kozhevatov.

Events

The band has participated in socially significant cultural events in Russia including:

 Moscow Victory Day Parade 
 Concert performances in the State Kremlin Palace, the State Duma, and the House of Moscow Oblast Government.
 Spasskaya Tower Military Music Festival and Tattoo
 Moscow City Day parade
 Festival of massed bands (Arkhangelsk)
 Festival of massed bands (St. Petersburg)
 The World Military Music Festival in Tripoli in honor of the ruby jubilee of the 1969 Libyan coup d'etat.
 Festival of children's and youth creativity "Salvation Star-2019"

See also
 Presidential Band of the Russian Federation 
 Military Band Service of the National Guard of Russia
 Central Band of the Border Guard Service of the Federal Security Service of Russia
 Police Band Service of the Ministry of Internal Affairs of Russia

References

Russian military bands
Ministry of Emergency Situations (Russia)